This is intended to be a complete list of properties and districts listed on the National Register of Historic Places in Cattaraugus County, New York.  The locations of National Register properties and districts for which the latitude and longitude coordinates are included below, may be seen in a map.



Listings county-wide

|}

References

External links

A useful list of the above sites, with street addresses and other information, is available at Cattaraugus County listing, at National Register of Historic Places.Com, a private site serving up public domain information on NRHPs.

Cattaraugus County, New York
Cattaraugus County